York Crown Court is a Crown Court venue which deals with criminal cases at York Castle in York, England. It is a Grade I listed building.

History
Originally the assizes for the City of York were held in York Guildhall in St Martins Courtyard, Coney Street. However, judicial matters moved to York Castle when a Grand Jury House was built there in 1668 and supplemented by a Sessions House of 1675. However, by the mid 18th century, the Grand Jury House had become dilapidated and it was decided to demolish it and to erect a new building on the same site.

The new building was commissioned to serve as the assizes courts for the City of York. It was designed by John Carr in the neoclassical style, built in ashlar stone and was completed in 1777. The design involved a symmetrical main frontage of thirteen bays, with single-storey end bays which were slightly recessed: it faced onto the castle courtyard, which was grassed over at that time to form a circle, which became known as the "Eye of the Ridings". The central section featured a tetrastyle portico in antis formed by full-height Ionic order columns supporting an entablature and a modillioned pediment. The wings of four bays each were fenestrated by round headed sash windows on the ground floor and by small square windows on the first floor. The outer bays of the wings also featured full-height Ionic order columns in antis supporting an entablature. Internally, the building was laid out to accommodate two large courtrooms, one to the left and one to the right.

Notable cases in the 19th century included the trial and conviction, in November 1882, of Mary Fitzpatrick for the murder of a glass blower, James Richardson. Following the implementation of the Courts Act 1971, the former assizes courthouse was re-designated York Crown Court, and an extensive programme of refurbishment was completed in 1991.

In 2010, the court was the venue for the trial and conviction of the footballers, Craig Nelthorpe and Michael Rankine for affray following a disturbance in the city centre. A climactic scene for the television series Death Comes to Pemberley was filmed on a purpose-built scaffold outside the building in 2013.

See also
 Grade I listed buildings in the City of York

References

External links

 Court information

Crown Court buildings
Government buildings completed in 1777
Buildings and structures in York
Grade I listed buildings in York
Court buildings in England